The Katzbach Mountains or Kaczawskie Mountains are a mountain range, roughly 30 kilometres long, in the Western Sudetes in Poland. It is located within the Polish province of Lower Silesia. Its highest peak is the  Melkgelte / Skopiec (724 m). To the north of the Katzbach Mountains are the Katzbach Foothills.

Location 
The ridge, which runs from northwest to southeast at heights between 400 and 700 metres, is a fold mountain range consisting of limestone, slate and dolomite. In the west the Bober separates the range from the Jizera Mountains and Jizera Foreland; to the north are the Katzbach Foothills; to the east the Raging Neisse / Nysa Szalona forms the boundary. In the southeast, the Katzbach Mountains merge into the Waldenburg/Walbrzyskie Highlands. To the south, the Landeshut Ridge / Rudawy Janowickie and Jelenia Gora Valley form the transition to the Giant Mountains.

External links

Sudetes
Mountain ranges of Poland